The Battle of Hong Kong , also known as The Day England Fell, is the sole film made in Hong Kong during the Japanese occupation from 1941 to 1945. The 1942 film was produced by the Japanese Dai Nippon Film Company, was directed by Shigeo Tanaka (田中重雄 Tanaka Shigeo) and featured an all-Japanese cast, but some Hong Kong film personalities were also involved in its making.

The Japanese used the film to spread anti-British propaganda; the film portrays the British as having brutal and racist attitudes while in Hong Kong. This film is now lost.

See also
 List of Hong Kong films

References

External links
 

Hong Kong war drama films
1942 films
Lost Japanese films
Japanese World War II propaganda films
1942 in Hong Kong
1940s lost films
1940s war drama films
Japanese war drama films
Japanese black-and-white films
Battle of Hong Kong
1942 drama films
Japanese World War II films
1940s Japanese-language films